State Route 198 (SR 198) is a state highway that runs northwest–southeast for  through portions of Banks and Franklin counties in the northeastern part of the U.S. state of Georgia.

Route description
The route begins at an intersection with US 441/SR 15 southeast of Baldwin, in Banks County. It curves to the southeast to an intersection with SR 63, just before crossing into Franklin County. It crosses over, but does not have an interchange with Interstate 85 just prior to meeting its eastern terminus, an intersection with SR 59 southwest of Carnesville.

Major intersections

See also

References

External links

 Georgia Roads (Routes 181 - 200)

198
Transportation in Banks County, Georgia
Transportation in Franklin County, Georgia